Ivo Rüthemann (born December 12, 1976) is a former Swiss professional ice hockey winger.

Playing career 
His career started with SC Rheintal. He transferred to HC Davos of the National League A (NLA) in 1994, where he played until 1999, when he opted to sign with fellow NLA side SC Bern. He remained with the club for the remainder of his career, winning Swiss championships in 2004, 2010 and 2013 as well as the 2000 Spengler Cup. He received NLA MVP honors in 2003-04 and 2009-10. Rüthemann put an end to his playing career after the 2013-14 season. In 1072 NLA games, he recorded 311 goals and 399 assists.

For his career achievements, he was presented with the "Special Award" by the Swiss ice hockey federation in 2014. Rüthemann had his jersey number 32 retired by SC Bern in November 2014.

International play 
Rüthemann has played 236 games for the Swiss national team. He attended three Olympic Games (2002, 2006, 2010) and twelve World Championships.

Career statistics

Regular season and playoffs

International

External links
 
 Fansite about Ivo Rüthemann

References 

1976 births
HC Davos players
Ice hockey players at the 2002 Winter Olympics
Ice hockey players at the 2006 Winter Olympics
Ice hockey players at the 2010 Winter Olympics
Living people
Olympic ice hockey players of Switzerland
SC Bern players
Swiss ice hockey left wingers